John R. Pitsenbarger is an American politician and farmer from West Virginia. A Republican, Pitsenbarger represented the 11th district of the West Virginia Senate from 2019 to 2020.

Pitsenbarger operates a farm in Nicholas County, where he lives with his wife. He is currently the vice president of the West Virginia Farm Bureau, and a field enumerator for the U.S. Department of Agriculture's National Agricultural Statistics Service in Charleston.

References

Living people
People from Nicholas County, West Virginia
Republican Party West Virginia state senators
21st-century American politicians
Year of birth missing (living people)